Peel, also known as An Exercise in Discipline – Peel, is a 1986 Australian short film directed by Jane Campion. A father along with his son and sister are taking a trip, during which an orange peel has significance.  Peel won the Short Film Palme d'Or at the 1986 Cannes Film Festival, making Campion the first ever woman to win the award.

References

External links

Peel at Oz Movies

1986 films
1986 short films
Australian drama films
Short Film Palme d'Or winners
Films directed by Jane Campion
1986 drama films
1980s English-language films
1980s Australian films